Celestite  is the fifth full-length studio album by American black metal band Wolves in the Throne Room. It was released through their own label Artemisia Records on July 8, 2014. The album explores the themes of the band's previous album Celestial Lineage through an experimental, drone-based dark ambient style, eschewing vocals and the black metal aggression which characterizes their other works.

Track listing

Personnel
Adapted from the AllMusic credits.
Aaron Weaver – synthesizers, guitars
Nathan Weaver – synthesizers, guitars

Guest musicians
Randall Dunn – synthesizers, H3000 sound design, electrical processing
Timm Mason – serge modulator (all tracks)
Steve Moore – French horn, trombone (on tracks: 1, 4, 5)
Josiah Boothby – French horn, trombone (on tracks: 1, 4, 5)
Mara Winter – flute (on tracks: 1, 4)
Veronica Dye – flute (on tracks: 3, 5)

Production
Produced By: Randall Dunn and Wolves in the Throne Room
Recorded By: Randall Dunn at AVAST and Owl Lodge
Additional Recording by: Aaron Weaver at Owl Lodge
Mixed at AVAST by Randall Dunn
Mastered by Jason Ward at Chicago Mastering Service

References

External links
 Wolves in the Throne Room official website
 Artemisia Records Bandcamp

2014 albums
Wolves in the Throne Room albums